The 2010 Tour de las Américas was the 10th season of the Tour de las Américas, the main professional golf tour in Latin America since it was established in 2000.

The tour continued its close association with the European Tour, with one event, the Abierto Internacional de Golf Copa Antioquia being co-sanctioned by the Challenge Tour, Europe's official development tour.

The Order of Merit was won by Argentina's Julián Etulain.

Schedule
The following table lists official events during the 2010 season.

Order of Merit
The Order of Merit was based on prize money won during the season, calculated using a points-based system.

Notes

References

External links
Official site

Tour de las Américas
Tour de las Américas